The Lost City is a 2022 American action-adventure comedy film directed by the Nee brothers, who co-wrote the screenplay with Oren Uziel and Dana Fox, from a story conceived by Seth Gordon. It stars Sandra Bullock and Channing Tatum as a romance novelist and her cover model respectively who must escape a billionaire (Daniel Radcliffe) who wants her to find a lost ancient burial chamber described in one of her books. The film co-stars Da'Vine Joy Randolph and Brad Pitt.

The project was announced in October 2020, with Bullock joining as producer and star and Tatum joining that December; the rest of the cast was announced the following year. Filming took place in the Dominican Republic from May to August 2021. The film premiered at South by Southwest on March 12, 2022, and was theatrically released by Paramount Pictures in the United States on March 25, 2022. It received generally positive reviews from critics and grossed over $190 million worldwide against a $68 million budget.

Plot
Loretta Sage, a grumpy middle-aged woman, writes romance-adventure novels centered on a fictional heroine, Dr. Angela Lovemore, and her romantic interest, Dash McMahon. To promote the latest Lovemore book, her publisher, Beth Hatten, insists that Loretta embark on a book tour with Alan Caprison, the book's cover model for Dash, despite her reclusiveness after her husband's death.

After a disastrous start, mostly due to the fans' obsession with Alan's Dash persona, Loretta is kidnapped by billionaire Abigail Fairfax, who realizes that Loretta based her books on actual historical research she did with her late archaeologist husband. Fairfax has discovered a lost city on a remote Atlantic island and is convinced that the Crown of Fire, a priceless treasure belonging to the ancient King Kalaman and Queen Taha, is located there. When she declines to help decipher an ancient map to the treasure, Fairfax, fearing an active volcano will destroy the site, has Loretta chloroformed and takes her to the island.

Alan, who is secretly enamored with Loretta, witnesses her being kidnapped. He recruits Jack Trainer, a former Navy SEAL turned CIA operative and meets with him on the island to coordinate a rescue. With no assistance from Alan, Jack breaches Fairfax's compound and frees Loretta. As the trio attempt to flee, a gunfight ensues, and Jack is apparently shot dead. Loretta and Alan escape into the jungle.

The two spend a day running from Fairfax's henchmen, then spend a night in a hammock in the jungle, before reaching a nearby village. Upon hearing a local singing a folk song, Loretta deduces that the crown is hidden in a cenote in the jungle. However, before they can leave, Fairfax again captures Loretta. Alan chases them on a motorcycle, but he is also caught, and Fairfax forces the two to reveal the treasure's location.

At the tomb's site, they discover it is not a treasure-filled monument of Taha and Kalaman's power, but a secret place for the queen to grieve her husband's death. Her Crown of Fire was made of red seashells the king gathered to show his love for her. The actual treasure of the legend was not a priceless jewel, but the inseparable love between the king and queen.

Enraged, Fairfax seals Loretta and Alan inside the tomb as the volcano erupts. Rafi, one of Fairfax's henchmen, having a change of heart due to Fairfax's cruelty to him, leaves a crowbar to help Loretta and Alan escape. He then abandons Fairfax on the island. Beth arrives with the local coast guard who rescue Loretta and Alan and arrest Fairfax. Loretta's next book, based on her adventure with Alan, is a success, and they share a kiss at the end of the book tour.

In a mid-credits scene, Loretta and Alan are shown attending a meditation class where they unexpectedly meet Jack, who is revealed to have somehow survived after being shot in the head, and claims he did so by using 10% of his brain.

Cast

 Sandra Bullock as Loretta Sage, a successful yet depressed best-selling romance novelist. Bullock also plays Dr. Angela Lovemore, the heroine in her book series.
 Channing Tatum as Alan Caprison, a dimwitted cover model for Loretta's novel The Lost City of D. Tatum also plays Dash McMahon, the hero in her book series.
 Daniel Radcliffe as Abigail Fairfax, an egotistical, eccentric billionaire who seeks to find the treasure of the Lost City.
 Da'Vine Joy Randolph as Beth Hatten, Loretta's publisher
 Héctor Aníbal as Rafi, one of Fairfax's henchmen who is native to the island
 Thomas Forbes-Johnson as Julian, Fairfax's brutish henchman
 Oscar Nunez as Oscar, an eccentric cargo plane pilot
 Patti Harrison as Allison, Loretta's social media manager
 Brad Pitt as Jack Trainer, human tracker and action man
 Bowen Yang as Ray, the moderator for the book conference
 Joan Pringle as Nana, Beth's grandmother

Additionally, Raymond Lee appears as Officer Gomez, Adam Nee appears as Officer Sawyer, and Stephen Lang (credited as Slang) appears as the fantasy villain imagined by Loretta.

Production
In October 2020, it was announced Sandra Bullock would star in the film The Lost City of D, with Aaron and Adam Nee directing from a screenplay by Seth Gordon and Dana Fox, with Bullock serving as a producer under her Fortis Films banner, and Paramount Pictures to distribute. Bullock originally passed on the project because she felt the story was "outdated" due to it being in development for seven years. That December, Channing Tatum was cast as the male lead. Between March and April 2021, Patti Harrison, Da'Vine Joy Randolph, Daniel Radcliffe, Brad Pitt, and Oscar Nunez joined the cast, with Pitt and Lang appearing in cameo roles.

Principal photography began in May 2021 in the Dominican Republic, including Samaná, Santo Domingo, Casa de Campo, Monte Plata Province and Pinewood Dominican Republic Studios. It wrapped on August 16, 2021.

Release
The Lost City premiered at the South by Southwest film festival on March 12, 2022. In October 2021, it was announced that The Lost City of D had been retitled The Lost City, and that it would be theatrically released on March 25, 2022, after previously having been set for April 15, 2022. On March 1, 2022, the film's theatrical release in Russia was canceled due to the country's invasion of Ukraine. The film became available to stream on Paramount+ on May 10, 2022. It was also released on EPIX on the same day as part of Paramount's pay-one window deal with the company. According to data from Samba TV, 1.5 million US households watched The Lost City in its first six days of streaming. It was released on Blu-ray, DVD, and Ultra HD Blu-ray on July 26 by Paramount Pictures Home Entertainment.

Reception

Box office
The Lost City grossed $105.3 million in the United States and Canada, and $87.6 million in other territories, for a worldwide total of $192.9 million.

In the United States and Canada, the film was released alongside Infinite Storm and RRR, and was projected to gross $20–34 million from 4,228 theaters in its opening weekend. The film grossed $11.5 million on its first day, including $2.5 million from Thursday preview screenings. It went on to debut to $30.5 million, displacing The Batman from atop the box office. Its debut was the second-largest for Paramount during the COVID-19 pandemic, behind A Quiet Place Part II. It also posted the highest opening weekend for an original film since the pandemic. In its second weekend, the film made $14.7 million for a fall of 52%, and was placed second at the box office behind Morbius. It then made $9 million in its third weekend, finishing third. In the film's tenth weekend of release it made $2.3 million, crossing the $100 million domestic mark in the process.

Outside the US and Canada, the film grossed $3.7 million from sixteen international markets in its opening weekend.

Critical response
The website's critical consensus reads, "The Lost City doesn't sparkle quite as brightly as some classic treasure-hunting capers, but its stars' screwball chemistry make this movie well worth romancing." On Metacritic, it has a weighted average score of 60 out of 100 based on 53 critics, indicating "mixed or average reviews". Audiences polled by CinemaScore gave the film an average grade of "B+" on an A+ to F scale, while those at PostTrak gave it an 81% positive score, with 61% saying they would definitely recommend it.

Manohla Dargis of The New York Times said "It's too bad that The Lost City isn't more ambitious, because a woman writing her dreams into reality is a potentially rich riff on the Pygmalion and Galatea myth... While Raiders [of the Lost Ark] transcends its inspirations with wit and Steven Spielberg's filmmaking and Romancing [the Stone] tries hard to do the same, The Lost City remains a copy of a copy." Siddhant Adlakha of IGN giving film a 6 out of 10, calling it "a decent action-comedy that coasts on the presence of its stars."

Peter Debruge of Variety said, "The result can feel a little rickety in places, but the Nee brothers — who share screenplay credit with Oren Uziel and Dana Fox — have punched it up with off-color jokes, looped over moments when the characters' mouths are off-camera. In this and myriad other ways, The Lost City proves they do in fact make 'em like they used to." Writing for Rolling Stone, David Fear said "The movie itself is trying to excavate a long-lost genre: the big-budget action-adventure movie-star rom-com. It wants to be a modern Romancing the Stone so badly you can almost see the flop-sweat dripping down the screen."

See also 
 Romancing the Stone, 1984 film with a similar premise
 The Lost City of Z
 Nim's Island

References

External links
 
 

2022 films
2022 adventure films
2022 comedy films
2022 romantic comedy films
2020s adventure comedy films
2020s English-language films
4DX films
American adventure comedy films
American romantic comedy films
Films about kidnapping
Films about writers
Films directed by Aaron and Adam Nee
Films produced by Sandra Bullock
Films set in the Atlantic Ocean
Films set on fictional islands
Films scored by Pinar Toprak
Films shot in the Dominican Republic
Films with screenplays by Aaron and Adam Nee
Jungle adventure films
Paramount Pictures films
Treasure hunt films
2020s American films